Žan Košir (born 11 April 1984) is a Slovenian snowboarder.

Košir represented Slovenia at the 2010 Winter Olympics where he finished 6th in parallel giant slalom. At the 2014 Winter Olympics, Košir won a bronze medal in the same discipline, beating Patrick Bussler of Germany in the bronze medal race.

World Cup results

Season titles
 3 titles – (1 parallel overall, 1 parallel giant slalom, 1 parallel slalom)

Race podiums
 4 wins – (3 PSL, 1 PGS)
 15 podiums – (8 PSL, 7 PGS)

Olympic results

World Championships results

References

External links

1984 births
Slovenian male snowboarders
Living people
Olympic snowboarders of Slovenia
Snowboarders at the 2010 Winter Olympics
Snowboarders at the 2014 Winter Olympics
Snowboarders at the 2018 Winter Olympics
Snowboarders at the 2022 Winter Olympics
Sportspeople from Kranj
Medalists at the 2014 Winter Olympics
Medalists at the 2018 Winter Olympics
Olympic silver medalists for Slovenia
Olympic bronze medalists for Slovenia
Olympic medalists in snowboarding
Universiade medalists in snowboarding
Universiade silver medalists for Slovenia
Competitors at the 2005 Winter Universiade
Competitors at the 2007 Winter Universiade
21st-century Slovenian people